José Luís Santos da Visitação, or simply Zé Luís (born March 23, 1979 in Salvador), is a Brazilian defensive midfielder. He currently plays for Paraná Clube.

Mainly a defensive midfielder, he can also play as a right back and central defender.

Club statistics

Honours
São Paulo
 Brazilian League: 2
 2007, 2008

External links

 saopaulofc.net
 rsssfbrasil
 CBF

1979 births
Living people
Brazilian footballers
Brazilian expatriate footballers
Campeonato Brasileiro Série A players
Mogi Mirim Esporte Clube players
Cruzeiro Esporte Clube players
Marília Atlético Clube players
Clube Atlético Mineiro players
Associação Desportiva São Caetano players
Expatriate footballers in Japan
J2 League players
Tokyo Verdy players
São Paulo FC players
Esporte Clube Vitória players
Itumbiara Esporte Clube players
Paraná Clube players
Association football midfielders
Sportspeople from Salvador, Bahia